Interstate 3 (I-3), the 3rd Infantry Division Highway, is a proposed Interstate Highway in the United States to run from Savannah, Georgia, north to Augusta, Georgia, and Knoxville, Tennessee. The roadway was proposed in the same federal highway measure that gave birth to a proposal for I-14.

History

In 2005, the Safe, Accountable, Flexible, Efficient Transportation Equity Act: A Legacy for Users (SAFETEA-LU) was signed into law by then-President George W. Bush. The act included the proposed corridors for the planned I-14 (specifically as the 14th Amendment Highway), and I-3 (as the 3rd Infantry Division Highway). The legislation did not provide the official numbering nor did it provide funding for the highways.

The proposed numbering of the highway does not follow the pattern of the existing Interstate Highway grid but is noted to salute and honor the 3rd Infantry Division of the US Army, based at Fort Stewart, near Savannah, Georgia.

According to the Georgia Department of Transportation, the existing Savannah River Parkway, which carries the unsigned designations State Route 555 (SR 555) and SR 565, is open to traffic. It begins just northwest of Savannah at the intersection of I-95 and SR 21/SR 30. It travels northwesterly along SR 21, paralleling the Savannah River, to Millen, where it meets US Route 25 (US 25). From Millen, the roadway follows US 25 to I-520 in Augusta. A western branch of the Savannah River Parkway travels from I-16 south of Statesboro north and northwestward (following US 25) to meet the main parkway roadway in Millen.

The proposal currently faces local opposition from groups concerned about the environmental impact of the Interstate Highway. No date for construction of the highway has been set. The federal government began a study of the proposed route in July 2010. In early 2012, the Federal Highway Administration released a report to the US Congress noting the potential financial and environmental costs of the highway as well as the public opposition.

Route description
The actual route of I-3 is unknown. However, the 2005 SAFETEA-LU legislation indicated that, in Georgia, I-3 would follow the existing Savannah River Parkway from Savannah to Augusta.

Due to the difficulties of building a new highway through the Appalachian Mountains, the highway's proposed route north of Augusta is less clear. In early 2008, officials introduced the possibility of routing I-3 through Greenwood, South Carolina, and continuing on to Greenville. Other potential routes continue in Georgia along US 441, US 129 (along the Dragon, an  stretch of road in North Carolina and Tennessee adjoining Great Smoky Mountains National Park with 318 curves), or SR 77.

The proposed numbering of the highway does not fit within the usual conventions of the existing Interstate Highway grid, where primary north–south highways are assigned odd numbers, and such odd route numbers increase from west to east. Under the normal Interstate Highway grid, I-3 should instead be located on the West Coast between the Pacific Ocean and I-5. All odd numbers between I-75 and I-95 are already assigned, but most them are confined to states well north of the proposed route. The 2017 approval of second I-87 in North Carolina in addition to the I-87 in New York may indicate willingness to duplicate other north–south route numbers.

See also
 
 
 Central Savannah River Area

References

External links

 2005 SAFETEA-LU legislation, from the Library of Congress 
 Third Infantry Division Highway Corridor Study
 U.S. DOT - 3rd Infantry Division Highway Corridor Study: Third Meeting of the Expert Working Group
 Georgia DOT - Savannah River Parkway description
 Interstate Guide Proposed Interstates: I-3
 I-3 on The Virginia Highways Project's NCRoads.com Annex

03
03
03